This glossary of automotive terms is a list of definitions of terms and concepts related to automobiles, including their parts, operation, and manufacture, as well as automotive engineering, auto repair, and the automotive industry in general. For more specific terminology regarding the design and classification of various automobile styles, see Glossary of automotive design; for terms related to transportation by road, see Glossary of road transport terms; for competitive auto racing, see Glossary of motorsport terms.

A

B

Body-in-Blue

C

D

E

F

G

H

I

J

K

L

M

N

O

P

R

S

T

U

V

W

Y

See also
Glossary of automotive design
Glossary of mechanical engineering
Glossary of motorsport terms
Glossary of road transport terms
List of auto parts
Outline of automobiles

References

Automotive terms
Automotive terminology
Wikipedia glossaries using description lists